AL-LAD, also known as 6-allyl-6-nor-LSD, is a psychedelic drug and an analog of lysergic acid diethylamide (LSD). It is described by Alexander Shulgin in the book TiHKAL (Tryptamines i Have Known And Loved). It is synthesized starting from nor-LSD as a precursor, using allyl bromide as a reactant.

Effects in humans 

While AL-LAD has subtly different effects than LSD, and appears to be slightly shorter lasting, their potencies are similar; an active dose of AL-LAD is reported to be between 50 and 150 micrograms. AL-LAD has a known but short and highly uncommon history of recreational human use, which originated in Ireland and the UK, but spread internationally.

Chemistry
AL-LAD does not cause a color change with the Marquis, Mecke or Mandelin reagents, but does cause the Ehrlich's reagent to turn purple because of the presence of the indole moiety in its structure.

Legal status 
AL-LAD is not scheduled by the United Nations' Convention on Psychotropic Substances.

Denmark 
AL-LAD is illegal in Denmark.

Latvia 
AL-LAD is possibly illegal in Latvia. Although it isn't specifically scheduled, it may be controlled as an LSD structural analog due to an amendment made on June 1, 2015.

Romania

AL-LAD is illegal in Romania. It is not included directly in the list of controlled substances, but it is included in an analogue act

Sweden 
The Riksdag added AL-LAD to Narcotic Drugs Punishments Act under Swedish schedule I ("substances, plant materials and fungi which normally do not have medical use" ) as of January 26, 2016, published by Medical Products Agency (MPA) in regulation HSLF-FS 2015:35 listed as 6-allyl-6-nor-LSD, AL-LAD, and 6-allyl-N,N-dietyl-9,10-didehydroergolin-8-karboxamid.

Switzerland 
AL-LAD is illegal in Switzerland.

United Kingdom 
AL-LAD is illegal in the UK. On June 10, 2014 the UK Advisory Council on the Misuse of Drugs (ACMD) recommended that AL-LAD be specifically named in the UK Misuse of Drugs Act as a class A drug despite not identifying any harm associated with its use. The UK Home office accepted this advice and announced a ban of the substance to be enacted on 6 January 2015 as part of The Misuse of Drugs Act 1971 (Amendment) (No. 2) Order 2014.

United States
AL-LAD is a Controlled Substance at the federal level in the United States, AL-LAD is legally considered an analog of LSD, therefore, sales or possession with intent for human consumption could be prosecuted under the Federal Analogue Act.

See also 
 1cP-LSD
 1B-LSD
 1P-LSD
 1V-LSD
 ALD-52
 1cP-AL-LAD
 ETH-LAD
 PRO-LAD
 LSM-775
 LSZ

References

Further reading 

 
 
 >

External links 
 AL-LAD entry in TiHKAL
 AL-LAD entry in TiHKAL • info
 AL-LAD Thread at UKChemicalResearch.org 

Designer drugs
Lysergamides
Serotonin receptor agonists
Allylamines